The 1968 Tulane Green Wave football team was an American football team that represented Tulane University during the 1968 NCAA University Division football season as an independent. In their third year under head coach Jim Pittman, the team compiled a 2–8 record.

Schedule

Roster

References

Tulane
Tulane Green Wave football seasons
Tulane Green Wave football